Michael Christopher Tilley (born May 6, 1985 in Winston-Salem, North Carolina) is a professional shooter and USPSA Grand Master. He is also known for competing in the second season of History Channel's marksmen competition Top Shot.

Biography
Tilley was born on May 6, 1985 in Winston-Salem, North Carolina. He exhibited fascination and skill with firearms from a very young age. When he was eleven years old, his father built an indoor shooting range in Raleigh, North Carolina, affording Chris the opportunity to train and immerse himself. A year later, Tilley started competing at matches hosted by the IPSC and IDPA. 

Tilley mentions one of his father's first employees, a former Marine named Cazz, as a significant influence in his sport shooting career. Cazz brought Tilley to his first IPSC match, drawing him further into competitive shooting. Tilley became a USPSA Grand Master at the age of fourteen, making him one of the youngest Grand Masters in history.

In 2002 and 2005, Tilley won the World Junior Champion title. In 2003, he won the Point Series Champion, among other titles. He has won over 50 major matches and four National Championships (2006, 2008, 2015, and 2016). Tilley currently works at his family shooting range as a retailer and instructor.

In 2011, Tilley appeared in the second season of History Channel's marksmen competition Top Shot. During the first half of the competition, Tilley competed as part of the Blue Team. His team ended up winning two challenges during his tenure, and Chris was nominated for elimination once. He was eliminated during the sixth week of the competition.

In April 2011, Tilley won the USPSA Area 6 Open Division Handgun Championship. In October of the same year, he competed at the IPSC World Shoot XVI in Greece, finishing #6 overall.

Further accomplishments include first place in the 2016 IPSC Australasia Championship in the Open division of the Handgun discipline,  and placing in the top-three in two divisions of the 2007 USPSA National Handgun Championships.

References

External links
Chris Tilley Bio on History Channel
 

IPSC shooters
American male sport shooters
Living people
1985 births